Centreport may refer to:
Wellington Harbour, a large natural harbour at the southern tip of New Zealand's North Island.
CentrePort Canada, an inland port in Winnipeg and Rosser, Manitoba, Canada.
Centreport Aqueduct, a historic aqueduct in Cayuga County, New York.
CentrePort/DFW Airport Station, a Trinity Railway Express commuter rail station just south of Dallas/Fort Worth International Airport.